Chanctonbury Hill is an  biological Site of Special Scientific Interest west of Steyning in West Sussex. Part of it is Chanctonbury Ring, an early Iron Age hillfort which contains two Romano-Celtic temples and which is a Scheduled Monument.

This site on the steep slope of the South Downs is mainly woodland with some areas of chalk grassland. A dew pond has great crested newts, a species protected under the Wildlife and Countryside Act 1981. More than sixty species of breeding birds have been recorded, including meadow pipits, corn buntings and green woodpeckers.

References

Sites of Special Scientific Interest in West Sussex